The 23rd Ryder Cup Matches were held September 14–16, 1979, in the United States, at the Greenbrier Course of The Greenbrier in White Sulphur Springs, West Virginia.

It was the beginning of a new era for the Ryder Cup. For the first time, players from continental Europe took part in the Ryder Cup (specifically, Seve Ballesteros and Antonio Garrido of Spain). The new Team Europe replaced Great Britain and Ireland as the official opposition to the United States. It was hoped that the change would help raise the profile of the competition and bring about the end of near total domination by the United States that had existed since the end of the Second World War. However the change made no real impact at the first attempt as the United States won the competition easily by a score of 17 to 11 points and led after every session. Ballesteros and Garrido played together in all four team sessions and were 1–3; both lost their singles matches on Sunday. All four of Ballesteros' losses came against Larry Nelson.

Jack Nicklaus, age 39, failed to make the team for the first time since missing his first chance at making the team in 1967. Tom Watson left the day before the competition for the birth of his first child and was replaced on the team by first alternate Mark Hayes.

Format
The Ryder Cup is a match play event, with each match worth one point. The competition format was similar to the formats used from 1963 through 1975, but with fewer singles matches:
Day 1 — 4 four-ball (better ball) matches in a morning session and 4 foursome (alternate shot) matches in an afternoon session
Day 2 — 4 foursome matches in a morning session and 4 four-ball matches in an afternoon session
Day 3 — 12 singles matches, 6 each in morning and afternoon sessions
With a total of 28 points, 14 points were required to win the Cup.  All matches were played to a maximum of 18 holes.

Teams

Mark Hayes replaced Tom Watson.

The wild card selections are shown in yellow.

Friday's matches
September 14, 1979

Morning four-ball

Afternoon foursomes

Saturday's matches
September 15, 1979

Morning foursomes

Afternoon four-ball

Sunday's matches
September 16, 1979

Morning singles

Afternoon singles

Individual player records
Each entry refers to the win–loss–half record of the player.

Source:

United States

Europe

Controversy and fallout
On their return to the United Kingdom, Mark James and Ken Brown received the highest fines in professional golf up to this point. James received a £1500 fine for "unprofessional conduct" and Brown was fined £1000 and banned from international duty for 12 months.

Video
You Tube: 1979 Ryder Cup   Sunday singles

References

External links
PGA of America: 1979 Ryder Cup 
About.com: 1979 Ryder Cup

Ryder Cup
Golf in West Virginia
The Greenbrier
Ryder Cup
Ryder Cup
Ryder Cup
Ryder Cup